Koekelare is a municipality located in the Belgian province of West Flanders. The municipality comprises the towns of Bovekerke, Koekelare proper and Zande. On 1 January 2006 Koekelare had a total population of 8,291. The total area is 39.19 km² which gives a population density of 212 inhabitants per km².

Koekelare was formerly written as Couckelaere.

Towns
The municipality comprises Koekelare proper, but also contains the villages Bovekerke, Zande and De Mokker. Bovekerke and Zande are "deelgemeentes", who were independent municipalities until the 70s; De Mokker is part of Koekelare proper.

Source :Streekplatform Westhoek. Socio-economische beleidsvisie & hefboomprojecten voor de Westhoek

Koekelare borders the following villages:
a. Handzame (more specifically Edewalle) (Kortemark)
b. Werken (Kortemark)
c. Vladslo (Diksmuide)
d. Leke (Diksmuide)
e. Sint-Pieters-Kapelle (Middelkerke)
f. Zevekote (Gistel)
g. Moere (Gistel)
h. Eernegem (Ichtegem)
i. Ichtegem (Ichtegem)

Sights

Museums
 Lange Max Museum, located on Site Lange Max (World War I)
 Käthe Kollwitz Museum (World War I)
 Fransmansmuseum

Buildings, monuments and structures
 Hovaeremolen, a windmill used as German observation post during World War I.
 Batterie Pommern

References

External links

Website
Lange Max Museum

 
Municipalities of West Flanders